Sepak takraw at the 2014 Asian Games in Incheon was held from 20 September 2014 to 3 October 2014 at the Bucheon Gymnasium.

Schedule

Medalists

Men

Women

Medal table

Participating nations
A total of 210 athletes from 13 nations competed in sepak takraw at the 2014 Asian Games:

References

External links
Official website

 
2014 Asian Games events
2014